Albert Russell Main CBE FAA FANZAAS (6 March 1919 – 3 December 2009) was an Australian zoologist.

Born in Perth, Western Australia, he studied zoology at The University of Western Australia. He served in the Australian Imperial Force and the Royal Australian Air Force during World War II, but later returned to zoology, qualifying as a Doctor of Philosophy in 1956, and becoming a Professor of Zoology in 1967.

He received many honours for his contribution to zoology including the Mueller Medal, the Gold Medal of the Australian Ecological Society, a CBE, the Centenary Medal, and a Royal Society of Western Australia Medal. He was elected a Fellow of the Australian Academy of Science in 1969.

He was married to arachnologist Barbara York Main.

Bert Main is commemorated in the scientific names of a two species of Australian lizards: Lucasium maini and Menetia maini.

References

External links

20th-century Australian zoologists
1919 births
2009 deaths
Fellows of the Australian Academy of Science
Royal Society of Western Australia
Australian Commanders of the Order of the British Empire